Community Campaign (Hart) (CCH) is a minor localist political party based in the district of Hart in the north east of Hampshire. Founded in 2003, it has contested both district and county elections within Hart, and has successfully gained representation in both the district council and county council. The first Community Campaign Hart councillors were elected in 2004, with numbers increasing over the next few years; as of 2022 there are now ten. The party is currently in administration of the council in coalition with the Liberal Democrats, with 21 seats between them out of 33. Councillor James Radley is currently the Deputy Leader of the council, as well as holding portfolio for Finance & Corporate Services.

History 
Community Campaign Hart was formed at a meeting in 2003 attended by several local councillors, with an election strategy meeting taking place before the 2004 local elections. In the subsequent 2004 district council election, CCH candidates stood in five seats, gaining two (Church Crookham East and Church Crookham West) from the Conservatives, achieving 15% of the overall vote. In the 2006 election 3 new councillors were elected in Church Crookham East and Crondall, with another councillor elected in 2007 to the Fleet Courtmoor ward, bringing the number of CCH Councillors to 6. James Radley successfully defended his Church Crookham East seat in 2008, but the CCH candidate for Crondall did not win the seat from the Conservative incumbent.

Whilst no candidate stood in the 2005 Hampshire County Council Election, in 2009 Jenny Radley gained the seat of Church Crookham and Ewshot from the Conservative Party, with 3,822 votes (66.54%). In the 2010 Hart District Council Election, despite the CCH vote share increasing by 5.2, CCH incumbent John Bennison lost his Crondall seat to the Conservative candidate, who received 1,144 votes (51.9%) against Bennison's 1,059 (48.1%), though two other CCH incumbents retained their seats. The vote share then fell by 2.8 in 2011, but with the two CCH seats being defended successfully.

In the 2012 election, two more councillors were elected with a vote increase of 5.3, gaining the Crondall and Fleet Courtmoor seats from the Conservative incumbents. Councillor John Bennison, who had formerly been the CCH councillor for Crondall, defended the Church Crookham and Ewshot Division ward of Hampshire County Council in 2013, as the party's sole county councillor. In 2014 the number of seats on the council was reduced by two to 33, with redefined ward boundaries; in the 2014 election, CCH won 9 seats, an increase of 2 and with a slightly increased vote share. However, in 2015, John Bennison lost his Fleet Central Seat to the Conservative candidate (whilst remaining on the County Council), but with the party subsequently successfully defending the three seats up for re-election in 2016.

In 2017 John Bennison defended his county council, with a slightly increased vote share. Alan Oliver of the party also stood in the Fleet Town Ward, coming second after the Conservatives with 2,227 votes (39.22%). This is out of five councillors from Hart itself, alongside two Conservatives, and two Liberal Democrats. In the 2018 District Council election, the Angela Delaney gained Fleet West from the Conservative party with three further seats successfully defended, bringing the total number of councillors up to nine.

In the 2019 district election, two seats were successfully defended, with a further two gained from the Conservatives; whilst the Conservative remained the largest party on the council, Community Campaign alongside the Liberal Democrats formed a majority administration of 21 seats (out of 33 total); Liberal Democrat Councillor David Neighbour became leader of the Council, with Community Campaign Hart Leader James Radley becoming the Deputy Leader, with several CCH councillors gaining portfolio positions.

Whilst Hart District Council elections were originally scheduled to occur in 2020, due to the ongoing COVID-19 Pandemic, they were delayed and are due to be held in 2021, alongside the scheduled Hampshire County Council elections.

In the 2021 district election, the Fleet Central seat held by Wendy Makepeace-Browne was gained by Mark Butcher of the Conservatives in Fleet Central with a majority of 378 votes.

In the 2021 Hampshire County Council election John Bennison lost his county council seat, to Stephen Parker of the Conservatives, by 285 votes.

Currently sitting councillors

Borough Councillors

Electoral performance

District Council Elections

County Council Elections 

Since 2009, Community Campaign Hart has stood for council elections, standing in Church Crookham and Ewshot in all three elections since, and in Fleet Town in 2017, coming second with 2,227 votes (39.22%), behind the Conservatives with 2,735 votes (48.16%). There are five county council wards in Hart out of 78, compared to 32 district council seats.

2009

2013

2017

2021

Notes 

Political parties established in 2003
Locally based political parties in England
Politics of Hampshire
Hart District
2003 establishments in England
Organisations based in Hampshire